County Route 514 (CR 514) is a county highway in the U.S. state of New Jersey. The highway extends  from its western terminus U.S. Route 202 (US 202) and Route 31 in East Amwell Township to its eastern terminus Edgar Road in Elizabeth. West of its western terminus, CR 514 continues as Route 179.

Route description

CR 514 begins at an intersection with US 202/Route 31 in East Amwell Township, Hunterdon County, heading northeast on two-lane undivided Old York Road. West of US 202/Route 31, Old York Road becomes Route 179. A short distance after beginning, the road becomes the border between Raritan Township to the northwest and East Anwell Township to the southeast, passing through a mix of farmland and homes. The route reaches the residential community of Reaville, where CR 514 splits from Old York Road and heads northeast onto Amwell Road, with CR 613 continuing along Old York Road. The road comes to a junction with CR 609 before running east through more areas of agriculture and housing developments.

CR 514 continues east into Hillsborough Township in Somerset County, passing farms before continuing into more wooded areas with some agriculture and residences. The road enters woodland as it reaches an intersection with the southern terminus of CR 567 at Neshanic. The route passes through more areas of farms and woods before heading into wooded areas of residential development and coming to the CR 677 junction. At this point, CR 514 runs through woodland before passing more residential subdivisions and widening to four lanes as it comes to CR 625. The route passes north of Hillsborough High School and curves to the northeast, passing to the northwest of a park and ride lot before coming to the US 206 junction. At this point, the roadway turns east again and narrows back to two lanes. The road passes housing developments to the north and fields to the south, coming to an interchange with US 206 Bypass prior to passing over CSX's Trenton Subdivision. The route continues through farms, woods, and homes before reaching the CR 650 junction, at which point CR 514 turns northeast and enters Millstone. The road bypasses the residential neighborhoods of the borough to the north by passing through woodland and fields, turning east and intersecting CR 533 Spur and CR 533.

The route crosses the Millstone River into Franklin Township and passes over the Delaware and Raritan Canal in developed area known as East Millstone. From this point, CR 514 continues through more farmland and woodland, intersecting CR 621 before turning north and coming to the CR 619 junction. At this point, the route turns east again and enters residential surroundings, intersecting CR 615, where it turns east-southeast and widens to four lanes. The road becomes Hamilton Street at JFK Boulevard and heads into the community of Somerset. Here, the route begins to curve to the east-northeast as it comes to the CR 617 intersection, narrowing back to two lanes. Following this junction, the road passes through a mix of homes and businesses.

Upon crossing Mile Run Stream, CR 514 enters New Brunswick in Middlesex County and becomes unsigned and city maintained. CR 514 passes through more residential and commercial development as it comes to an intersection with Easton Avenue (CR 527). CR 514 and Hamilton Street continue past off-campus residences of Rutgers University and later pass through the College Avenue Campus of the university. After passing George Street (CR 672), the road becomes Johnson Drive and passes through the office complex of the Johnson & Johnson headquarters. The road curves to the south, passing under Amtrak's Northeast Corridor near the New Brunswick Station, and a ramp to Route 18 south. At Route 27 (Albany Street), CR 514 joins Albany St. and forms a concurrency with Route 27. After an interchange with Route 18, the road crosses the Raritan River on the Albany Street Bridge into Highland Park. Upon entering Highland Park, Route 27/CR 514 becomes two-lane Raritan Avenue, intersecting CR 622 and continuing through the downtown area of Highland Park. CR 514 splits from Route 27 by heading east on Woodbridge Avenue, where Middlesex County maintenance begins and signage resumes. Upon entering Edison, CR 676 intersects the route before it widens into a four-lane divided highway and interchanges with US 1. Following this, the road becomes two lanes and undivided again as it comes to the CR 529 junction and passes through residential areas.

CR 514 widens into a four-lane divided highway and passes over the New Jersey Turnpike (Interstate 95 or I-95) before coming to an intersection with CR 667. Past this intersection, the route turns northeast and passes Middlesex County College before running between residential areas to the northwest and commercial areas to the southeast. The road crosses Conrail Shared Assets Operations' Bonhamtown Industrial Track line and intersects CR 531, making a turn to the east. CR 514 turns northeast past more commercial development and intersects Raritan Center Parkway before coming to an interchange complex that has access to the New Jersey Turnpike and Route 440, I-287. Following this interchange, the route becomes undivided again and passes more businesses, crossing CR 501. The road narrows to two lanes at this point and continues into residential areas as it enters Woodbridge Township, where the name of the road becomes Main Street. CR 514 passes over both the New Jersey Turnpike and the Garden State Parkway simultaneously before heading into business areas as a four-lane road and reaching an interchange with US 9. Here, the road becomes two lanes again and passes homes before heading into the commercial downtown of Woodbridge at the Route 35 intersection. CR 514 passes under NJ Transit's North Jersey Coast Line near the Woodbridge Station prior to intersecting CR 652 and turning north onto Rahway Avenue. The road heads northeast through a mix of residences and businesses, with CR 604 joining the road for a short distance. The route crosses Conrail Shared Assets Operations' Port Reading Secondary line prior to intersecting CR 650. Farther north, CR 514 crosses Conrail Shared Assets Operations' Supermarket Lead line and heads through industrial areas to the east of East Jersey State Prison.

CR 514 continues into Rahway in Union County and becomes Lawrence Avenue, intersecting CR 621 and passes a few homes before crossing the Rahway River and intersects the southbound direction of US 1/9, with northbound US 1/9 passing over CR 514. From this point, the road continues past more residences, intersecting CR 608. At the CR 613 junction, the route turns northwest onto East Grand Avenue and passes under the Northeast Corridor. CR 514 turns northeast onto Elizabeth Avenue, with CR 613 resuming along West Grand Avenue, and heads through residential and commercial areas a short distance to the northwest of the Northeast Corridor as it crosses CR 652. The route enters Linden and heads past industry as it crosses an abandoned railroad branch.  The road intersects CR 615 and passes businesses as it comes to CR 617. CR 514 passes more homes and commercial establishments, intersecting CR 619 and crossing under an abandoned railroad line. The road runs through more urban areas of businesses and industry as it reaches the Park Avenue (CR 616) junction. The road becomes municipally maintained over the Northeast Corridor before turning east onto county-maintained East Linden Avenue. CR 514 continues into Elizabeth on Lidgerwood Avenue passing Elmora Avenue (Route 439). Past Garden Street, the street becomes one-way in the westbound direction. The CR 514 designation ends at the intersection of Edgar Road and Washington Avenue.

History
From New Brunswick to Rahway, CR 514 follows the Woodbridge Turnpike, legislated in 1808. A spur to the Blazing Star Ferry in Carteret was also legislated, which is now Port Reading Avenue.

Prior to the 600-series county route designations, CR 514 in Middlesex County was designated as County Route 1R2. Though not signed as such, CR 514 was formerly routed along Easton Avenue (CR 527) south of Hamilton Street, and then Albany Street (Route 27), in downtown New Brunswick.

Near its eastern terminus in Elizabeth, CR 514 continued further into the city's downtown. Because of the one-way Lidgerwood Avenue past Elmora Avenue, eastbound CR 514 traveled south on Kenneth Avenue before proceeding northeast on Edgar Road. The two directions continued on Washington Avenue before heading west on Pearl Street where it ended at Rahway Avenue (Route 27). The NJDOT straight line diagrams had also previously listed CR 514 continuing east of Park Avenue in Linden along Elizabeth Avenue and Fay Avenue ending at Route 439.

Two former spur routes of County Route 514 existed. The first County Route 514 Spur in Hunterdon County ran along what is now Hunterdon County Routes 613 and 650. The second County Route 514 Spur ran along what is now Middlesex County Route 622.

Major intersections

See also

References

External links

An enlarged view of road jurisdiction at the confluence of I 95, I 287, NJ 440 and CR 514 in Edison
NJ State Highways: CR 200-514
CR 514 pictures

514
514
514
514
514